Rangarj Mahalleh (also Romanized as Rangarj Maḩalleh) is a village in Khaleh Sara Rural District, Asalem District, Talesh County, Gilan Province, Iran. At the 2006 census, its population was 77, in 21 families.

References 

Populated places in Talesh County